Kung Fu vs. Yoga is a 1979 martial arts comedy film directed by Chan Chuen and starring Chin Yuet Sang, Alan Chui Chung-San and Michelle Yim.

Plot
Tiger (played by Chin Yuet Sang) and his buddy Wu Shing (played by Alan Chui) enter a competition in which Tiger wins and Ting (played by Michelle Yim) is forced into a marriage from the competition. However, Ting tells Tiger that if he gets three treasures for her then she will accept Tiger as her love. With the help of Wu Shing, Tiger must fight the mad monk, an intense trans woman, and finally the Yoga Master to get the treasures.

Casts
Chin Yuet Sang as Tiger
Alan Chui Chung-San as Wu Shing
Michelle Yim as Ting
Dunpar Singh as Yoga Master (Final Challenger)
Fung Hak On as Insane drag at brothel (Second Challenger)
San Kuai as Mad Monk (First Challenger)
Austin Wai as brothel customer who gets beaten
Chang Chung as Ting's father
Tai San
Chung Fat
Chik Ngai Hung

Trivia
The movie was a first starring role for both Chin Yuet Sang and Alan Chui Chung-San
This was a first film in which Mang Hoi choreographed the action sequences.

References

External links

Hong Kong martial arts films
1970s Cantonese-language films
Kung fu films
1970s action films
1970s Hong Kong films